Mr Handy Mr Hong (lit. "If something happens to someone somewhere, he'll definitely show up, Hong Banjang) is a 2004 South Korean romantic comedy. The movie long title was inspired from original soundtrack of Japanese animation series Astro Ganger and currently the second longest title among films released in Korea. 

Starring Kim Joo-hyeok and Uhm Jung-hwa, this film were their second project after film Singles. It was released on cinema on March 12, 2004. This film got around 830,000 movie-goers.

In August 2005, it was screened in Nagoya, Sapporo, Tokyo and Osaka, as part of Cinema Korea 2005. It was an event to introduce Korean Cinema to Japanese fans.

Cast

Main Casts 
 Kim Joo-hyuk as Hong Banjang (Hong Du-sik)
 Hong Du-sik, a 30-year-old man with a tall, handsome appearance, knows anything and can do anything. His blank past in 3-year after his military discharge makes him even more mysterious. Some say he was an interpreter at the Korea-US summit, some say he was a bodyguard for a famous singer, and some say he crossed the Atlantic Ocean by swimming alone. But one day, this multi-talented man, Captain Hong, who says even ghosts cry, gets a once-in-a-lifetime obstacle.
Uhm Jung-hwa as Yoon Hye-jin
 Yoon Hyejin lost her job because her bluff resignation was accepted on the spot while protesting for her rights as dentist. She is eventually denied a job in Seoul due to her former boss scheme. Hye-jin settles down in a small city to open her own dental clinic.

Supporting Casts 
 Kim Ga-yeon as Oh Mi-seon - Hye-jin's friend and dental nurse.
 Ki Joo-bong as Chairman Yoon - Hye-jin's father
 Heo Gi-ho as Tae-ho - Chairman Yoon Driver

Appearance 
 Go Se-hoon as child Yoon Hye-jin
 Kim Yong-heon as Gi-cheol
 Son Jae-gon as Constable Kang
 Jang Shin-jo as Police corporal Jin
 Noh Seung-beom as Maeng
 Choi Young-jin as Galchi
 Hwang Soo-hyeon as Nopchi
 Lee Kyung-hee as aunt owner of Hye-jin’s house and clinic
 Goo Bon-im as Chinese restaurant lady
 Kim Jin-goo as Midwife grandmother
 Kang Jae-seop as Jae-su
 Lee Seon-kyu as section chief 1
 Bae Jang-soo as section chief 2
 Hong Seong-hyeon as Section chief 3
 Kim Yeong-bae as Director
 Lee Chang as broker 1
 Song Yeong-beom as broker 3
 Joo Hyo-man as grandfather 1
 Lee Bok-hee as grandfather 2
 Park Sin-beom as grandfather 3
 Im Cheon-yong as Mr. Kim
 Lee Ju-ri as Jae-soo
 Yoon Gap-soo as Jae-soo's father
 Kim Doo-chan as Ji-soo's husband
 Seok Jeong-man as Mr. Park
 Park Ji-hyeon as Bank clerk
 Hwang Ja-kyeong as Pregnant woman
 Kim Se-hee as Baby
 Jo Seong-je as fellow doctor 1
 Song Yeong-gyu as fellow doctor 2
 Lee Ho-woo as fellow doctor 3
 Kim Min-jeong as fellow doctor 4
 Jo Eun-hee as fellow doctor 5
 Oh Jeong-taek as Security room staff
 Kim Yeong-sook as Recycling middle aged woman
 Jang Dong-jik as President Park (special appearance)
 Kang Seong-pil as Driver (special appearance)
 Kim Joon-sung as Noh Do-cheol (special appearance)
 Lee Gyu-hwa as Trailer voice actor
 Seo Hye-jeong as Trailer Voice Actor

Plot 
Yoon Hye-jin is a dentist who works at a big hospital in Seoul. One day, she gives a bluff resignation to her superior to defend her rights as a dentist. However, her boss accepts her resignation on the spot. Due to a rumor created by her former boss, Hye-jin is denied hospital jobs in Seoul and forced to open her own clinic. She seeks to find a perfect location for her clinic with her limited savings, and this leads her to a small village by the sea. She meets Hong Du-sik, a banjang (neighborhood chief) who makes a living doing odd jobs for 50 bucks per day.

After securing a rental home and clinic in the village, Hye-jin persuades her best friend, nurse Oh Mi-seon, to move in with her and work at her clinic. The clinic runs into rough seas at first. Stuff happens that make Hye-jin run into Du-sik all the time and everywhere.

Original soundtrack 
Most of original soundtracks of this film was executively written by music director Lee Woo-hyun. There are two remakes of the famous songs of Yoo Jae-ha and Kim Kwang-seok included in the album. Both song were sung life by Kim Jo-hyuk in the film, however for the album Kim only recorded "With the mind to forget" by Kim Kwang-seok, whist "You in my arms" by Yoo Jae-ha was sung by Sing Yoo-jeong.

Awards and nominations

Production 
This film was director Kang Seok-beom's debut film. Produced by Zenith Entertainment, casting was first announced on October 10, 2003. Starring the late Kim Joo-hyeok and Uhm Jung-hwa, it was written by Kang Seok-beom and Shin Jung-goo.

Adaptation 
Plan to adapt this film into drama series was first announced on December 21, 2020 under the working title of Hong Ban-jang. The adaptation was written by Shin Ha-eun as her comeback after co-writing the 2019 drama The Crowned Clown. It was also announced that Kim Seon-ho and Shin Min-a we’re being offered the lead roles. In April 2, 2021, it was officially announced that Yoo Je-won will be directing the drama literally translated as Seaside Village Cha-Cha-Cha (갯마을 차차차). In the same time, Kim Seon-ho and Shin Min-a were confirmed as main leads, also Lee Sang-yi was being offered the role. Hometown Cha-Cha-Cha was aired from August 28 to October 17, 2021, on tvN's Saturdays and Sundays at 21:00 (KST) time slot. It is also available for streaming on Netflix.

References

External links 

Mr. Handy at Naver
Mr. Handy at Daum
Mr. Handy at Movist
Mr. Handy at KMDB

Films set in South Korea
South Korean romantic comedy films
South Korean romantic drama films
2004 films
2000s Korean-language films
2004 romantic comedy films
2000s South Korean films
2004 directorial debut films